"It's a Love Thing" is a song by American R&B group The Whispers, released in January 1981 (and in March in the UK) as a single from their 1980 album Imagination.

Reception
Reviewing the song for Record Mirror, James Hamilton described it as "skippable, but distinctive synth tones intro this thunderously smacking 0-117-118-119 bpm 12in smash-bound chunderer with cheerful catchy vocals and, as has been proved beyond question, real grow-on-you appeal".

Music video 
The music video features then-unknown actress Daphne Maxwell Reid as a correspondent in Hollywood waiting for the arrival of the group. As Scott gets out of the limousine, she asks him "how does it feel being platinum?", to which he replies "it feels great". She then asks another question and talks to the rest of the group before it cuts to the Whispers performing the song.

Track listings
7"

 "It's a Love Thing" – 3:44
 "Girl I Need You" – 4:17

12"

 "It's a Love Thing" – 5:09
 "Girl I Need You" – 4:17

Personnel
The Whispers

 Wallace "Scotty" Scott – lead vocals (tenor)
 Walter Scott – lead vocals (tenor)
 Leaveil Degree – backing vocals (falsetto)
 Marcus Hutson – backing vocals (baritone)
 Nicholas Caldwell – backing vocals (tenor)

Additional musicians

 Joey Gallo – keyboards
 Kevin Spencer – keyboards
 Rickey Smith – keyboards
 Earnest "Pepper" Reed – guitar
 Stephen Shockley – guitar
 Leon Sylvers III – bass
 Wardell Potts – drums
 Harvey Mason – percussion
 Gene Dozier – strings and horns arrangement

Charts
It peaked at number 2 on Billboard's R&B chart and number 9 on the UK Singles Chart, becoming their second and last UK top-ten hit.

Popular culture 
 The song appeared in the 2005 film Diary of a Mad Black Woman, although didn't feature on the soundtrack.
 It appeared in the 2018 film The Front Runner.
 In 2016, it was used in an advert for L'Oréal.

References

1981 singles
1980 songs
The Whispers songs
SOLAR Records singles